The men's 110 metres hurdles event at the 1963 Pan American Games was held at the Pacaembu Stadium in São Paulo on 28 April and 3 May.

Medalists

Results

Heats

Final

References

Athletics at the 1963 Pan American Games
1963